The Toro Rosso STR4 was a Formula One car which Scuderia Toro Rosso used in the 2009 Formula One season. The car was revealed to be a Red Bull RB5 with a 2008-spec Ferrari 056 engine in Barcelona on March 9, 2009. It was revealed before the testing session.

Competition history 
The STR4 was driven by Sébastien Bourdais and Sébastien Buemi for the first half of the season. Jaime Alguersuari replaced Bourdais from the Hungarian Grand Prix onwards.

Sébastien Buemi 
Buemi scored a 7th place on his debut race at the 2009 Australian Grand Prix. His teammate Sebastian Bourdais also scored points that race. He went on to finish 8th in China, before finishing 7th and 8th in the final two races in Brazil and Abu Dhabi.

Sébastien Bourdais 
Bourdais scored an 8th place at the 2009 Australian Grand Prix. His teammate Sébastien Buemi also scored points that race. However Bourdais had poor results during the 2008 season, scoring only 4 points unlike his 2008 teammate Sebastian Vettel who scored 35 and a race win in Monza. At the 2009 Hungarian Grand Prix, he was replaced by Jaime Alguersuari following a similar season of poor results, having scored only 2 points after the German Grand Prix before he was fired.

Jaime Alguersuari 
Alguersuari made his debut at the Hungarian Grand Prix as his predecessor Sébastien Bourdais was replaced following a string of poor results. However he only managed to finish 3 races out of the 8 he raced in, with a best result of 14th in the Brazilian Grand Prix.

Complete Formula One results
(key) (results in bold indicate pole position; results in italics indicate fastest lap)

 Driver failed to finish, but was classified as they had completed >90% of the race distance.
 – Sébastien Buemi followed the safety car to the pit lane on the final lap of the Italian Grand Prix, therefore he was not considered to have finished the race. He was classified as he had driven 90% of the winner's race distance.

Toro Rosso Formula One cars
2009 Formula One season cars